Margaret Todd is a four-masted schooner sailing out of Bar Harbor, Maine.

History
Margaret Todd was designed by her owner, Steven Pagels, and built by Schreiber Boatyard in St. Augustine, Florida. She was launched on April 11, 1998, and replaced her predecessor, Natalie Todd (later named American Pride) as a tourist vessel based in Bar Harbor, Maine.

See also
List of schooners

References

External links

1998 ships
Bar Harbor, Maine
Four-masted ships
Individual sailing vessels
Schooners of the United States
Ships built in Florida